Visage Technologies AB is a private company that produces computer vision software for face tracking (head tracking, face detection, eye tracking, face recognition) and face analysis (age detection, emotion recognition, gender detection), along with a special business unit in automotive industry. The primary product of Visage Technologies is a multiplatform software development kit visageSDK.

History 

Visage Technologies AB was founded in Linköping, Sweden in 2002. The founders of Visage Technologies were among the main contributors to the MPEG-4 Face and Body Animation International Standard. Since Visage Technologies' founders have academic background, Visage Technologies promotes research collaboration with academic institutions, especially with Faculty of Electrical Engineering and Computing, University of Zagreb and University of Linköping. From 2015, the company expanded with a new automotive industry business unit that works with object tracking.

Application 

Visage Technologies AB is licensing facial tracking technology for industrial and academic clients. Some of the previous and current industrial clients are: Fujitsu, BMW, Coca-Cola, Publicis Groupe, Facerig and Emotiv, while some agencies used visageSDK for mobile apps for Samsung, FX, or X Factor, along with marketing campaigns for Disney, Armani or Škoda.

Various academic institutions as well use visage|SDK to aid them in research, such as United States Naval Academy, Princeton University, Rutgers University, City College of New York, and McGill University. in the fields of face tracking and detection, artificial intelligence, natural language processing, and other computer vision studies and applications.

Recently, visageSDK has been used to create solutions for virtual makeup (Oriflame etc.) and 3D face filtering (face masking).

See also 

 Automotive industry
 Biometrics
 Computer vision
 Emotion recognition
 Eye tracking
 Face detection
 Facial motion capture
 Facial recognition system
 Game development
 Head tracking
 Machine learning
 Marketing research
 Three-dimensional face recognition
 visageSDK

References

External links 

 

Software companies of Sweden
Software companies of Croatia
Software companies established in 2002
Development software companies
Companies based in Östergötland County